Hridoye Mati O Manush (Bengali: হৃদয়ে মাতি হে মানুষ)  is an agricultural TV series produced, presented and directed by Shykh Seraj, a private television channel in Bangladesh, which started broadcasting weekly every Saturday from February 21, 2004 at 9:50 pm. The program collects and broadcasts various agricultural information from the country as well as from outside of the country (Bangladesh).

References

Television in Bangladesh
Bangladeshi television shows
Channel i original programming